Lundgren & Maurer was an Austin, Texas architecture firm active from 1950 until 1973. The firm was composed of principals Leonard J. Lundgren and Edward J. Maurer. 

In 1954 the firm won an American Institute of Architects (AIA) merit award for the Pi Kappa Alpha Fraternity House in Austin, Texas.

Job files, photographs, and personal papers of Lundgren and Maurer are included in the architectural archives of the Austin History Center. Materials in the collection cover Lundgren and Maurer's work from the period 1961 through 1985.

Notable buildings 
 Pi Kappa Alpha Fraternity House, Austin, TX, 1954
 Adams Extract Headquarters and Plant (Demolished), Austin, TX, 1955
 Texas State Memorial, Vicksburg National Military Park, Vicksburg, MS, 1963
 Congregation Beth Israel Sanctuary Building, Austin, TX, 1967
 Holiday Inn Motor Hotel (Longbeach), Los Angeles, CA, 1967
 Holiday Inn Motor Hotel (Brentwood), Los Angeles, CA, 1969
 Holiday Inn Austin Town Lake, Austin, TX, 1967

Residences 
Rubinett House, 3004 Belmont Cir., Austin, TX 1955
 Zidell House, 2015 W Lake Dr., Taylor, TX, 1953
 Sam Miller House, 6405 Shoal Creek Blvd., Austin, TX, 1955
 G.B. Guild House, 5817 Westslope Dr., Austin, TX, 1961

References

External links
 Holiday Inn Motor Hotel (Brentwood)  Los Angeles, CA, 1969
 Holiday Inn Motor Hotel (Longbeach)  Los Angeles, CA, 1967

Defunct architecture firms based in Texas
Companies based in Austin, Texas